The Snagov is a right tributary of the river Ialomița in Romania. It discharges into the Ialomița 2 km downstream from Siliștea Snagovului. Lake Snagov is located on the lower reach of the river.

References

Rivers of Romania
Rivers of Ilfov County
Rivers of Dâmbovița County